Otumba may refer to:
Otumba, State of Mexico, a municipality in the State of Mexico, Mexico
Otumba de Gómez Farías, a town and the municipal seat of Otumba municipality, State of Mexico
Otompan, a pre-Columbian altepetl
Battle of Otumba, a 1520 battle in the Spanish conquest of the Aztec Empire